The Basilica di San Marino is a Catholic church located in the Republic of San Marino. While the country has a distinct domination of historic religious buildings of Christian faith, the basilica is the main church of the City of San Marino.  It is situated on Piazzale Domus Plebis in the northeastern edge of the city, adjacent to the Church of St. Peter. It is dedicated to Saint Marinus, the founder and patron of the Republic.

The church has the status of co-cathedral of the Catholic Diocese of San Marino-Montefeltro.

The present church was built in 1836 in place of an earlier one that dated to 7th century.  It is built in the Neoclassical style, with a porch of eight Corinthian columns. Relics of St. Marino are enshrined in the church.

History

An earlier church was erected on the spot in the 4th century, dedicated to the same patron saint. The earliest mention of its  existence, the La Vita di San Severino by Eugippius, dates to 530.  A later document, the Placito Feretrano, dates from 885. The first document that directly relates to the "Pieve di San Marino" is dated 31 July 1113, with donations from the faithful public.

By the beginning of the 19th century, the church building was in critical condition. In 1807, it was demolished and a project for the construction of a replacement was commissioned from the Bolognese architect Achille Serra. On 24 July 1825, the council decided to build a new church on the same site as the former one. Construction began on 28 July 1826 and was completed in 1838. The construction cost 40,150 scudi and 76 baiocchi. On 5 February 1838, the church was solemnly consecrated by the Bishop of Montefeltro, Crispino Agostinucci in the presence of the Captains Regent. On 21 July 1926, it was raised  by Pius XI to the rank of  Basilica.

The Basilica of San Marino is depicted on the ten-cent Sammarinese euro coins.

On 29 August 1982, the basilica received a solemn visit from Pope John Paul II, who venerated relics of Saint Marinus. 

Over the course of centuries, the basilica has been the object of civil contestation. Because of this,  the Holy See issued in 1992 a number of decrees. Among other provisions, these established that the basilica, as the mother-church of all churches within the Republic, is made exempt from the jurisdiction of the parish of the city of San Marino. The priest to whom it is entrusted holds the title of Rector.

Architecture
The interior of the basilica consists of three naves, supported by sixteen Corinthian columns which form a large ambulatory around the semicircular apse. The front porch of 8 columns, six at the front and two either side, has a Latin inscription written above it which reads "DIVO. MARINO. PATRONO. ET. LIBERTATIS. AVCTORI. SEN. P. Q.". The altar is adorned by a statue of St. Marino by Adamo Tadolini, a student of Antonio Canova. Under the altar are relics of St. Marino which were found on 3 March 1586; some relics were donated to the island of Rab (Croatia), the birthplace of the saint, on 28 January 1595. A reliquary bust in silver and gold dated to 2 September 1602 lies to the right of altar. In the right aisle is a small altar dedicated to Mary Magdelene and a painting by Elisabetta Sirani, on the subject Noli me tangere.

Chiesa di San Pietro

The Chiesa di San Pietro is located at the Basilica of San Marino, to the side of the front steps. It was originally built in 600. It houses a valuable altar with inlaid marble, donated by the musician Antonio Tedeschi in 1689, which is surmounted by a statue dedicated to St. Peter by Enrico Saroldi. In the crypt of this church there are two niches cut into rock that are said to be the beds of San Marino and San Leo. Inside is a monument to Pope John XXIII, erected by the Government of the Republic.

Celebrations
Several liturgical celebrations are stipulated for the basilica.  Amongst these are included: the election and the establishment of the Captains Regent; the anniversary celebration of the Republic's Militia (25 March); national and religious holidays of San Marino, the Founder and Patron of the Republic (3 September), and St. Agatha, patroness of the Republic (5 February); and the religious festival honoring the St. of the Body and Blood of Christ.

The basilica can also function as a venue for popular events such as the XII Autumn Music Festival production in 2010 of Mozart's Requiem Mass.

References

Roman Catholic cathedrals in San Marino
Buildings and structures in the City of San Marino
Roman Catholic churches completed in 1838
19th-century Roman Catholic church buildings
Basilica churches in Europe